N'Dyelen Mbey Leeyti (ruled c.1450–c.1465) was the sixth ruler, or Burba, of the Jolof Empire.

References

15th-century monarchs in Africa
Year of birth missing
1465 deaths